Neung-sur-Beuvron (literally Neung on Beuvron) is a commune in the Loir-et-Cher department, in the administrative region of Centre-Val de Loire, France.

Geography
Neung's historic location is situated between two rivers, the Beuvron and the Tharonne.  From the air, one can easily see the circular outline of the ancient Gallic and Roman oppidum.

History
Neung-sur-Beuvron is thought to be the Roman town of Noviodunum Biturigum, in which Vercingetorix and Julius Caesar fought in 52 BC.  A few modest Roman remains still survive.  A surviving Roman road runs from Neung to La Ferté-Beauharnais, crossing the forest under the name of "les chemins bas" (the low roads).

Joan of Arc also passed through the village after the liberation of Orléans in 1429.  This and the battle of 52 BC are commemorated by plaques on the village church.

Population

International relations
It is twinned with Williton, Somerset, in the UK and Wulften am Harz, Lower Saxony, Germany.

See also
Communes of the Loir-et-Cher department

References

Communes of Loir-et-Cher
Bituriges Cubi